Man with Two Lives is a 1942 American film directed by Phil Rosen and written by Joseph Hoffman.

Plot 
The story is of a man who is brought back from the dead and whose body is hijacked by the soul of an executed gangster, consequently making the deceased man a high-ranking criminal.

At the beginning of the story, the happy couple Phillip Bennett and Louise Hammond are engaged to be married. A major bump on their planned road to the future emerges when sadly Phillip is killed in a traffic accident as they are driving back from their engagement party.

The dubious Dr. Clarke, who apparently is known for being able to revive deceased animals, is called on for the purpose of bringing Phillip back to life. By midnight on that very same night as Phillip's demise, the infamous criminal Panino is to receive his capital punishment for his crimes: execution via electrocution.

Just minutes before midnight Dr. Clarke performs his resuscitation operation and it is a successful one, but when Panino dies moments later his soul enters Phillip's body. The soul change goes unnoticed however, and Phillip's body is brought home to his hopeful wife to be. At first it appears Phillip suffers from severe amnesia, and he is uncapable of recognizing any of the persons previously known to him, which is of course an unpleasant surprise.

Phillip instantly starts roaming Panino's old hoods, and it doesn't take long before he once again is supreme commander of his old gang, running the business as usual, but in the shape of Phillip. The people around Phillip, including his father Hobart Bennet is worried by the development and this new personality of Phillip's. They become even more worried when they start noticing that he is more and more absent from his home. Soon a crime wave hits the city and there is an outbreak of gang wars, throwing the city into chaos as gang members are killed on every side. Accompanied by Dr. Clarke, Phillip's father Hobart visits the gang's headquarters and meets with the gangsters, to tell them who Panino/Phillip really is. They ask the gang members about Phillip's relation to the gang and its business, and the gang members find out that Phillip, a respectable citizen, is the son of Hobart Bennet. Phillip/Panino finds out about this and feels threatened by the fact that some of the gang members know about his "secret identity". He murders all of the potentially dangerous gang members, but fails to kill one person, a brother to one of the murdered gang members, who knows his secret.

This remaining man becomes the key to catching Panino/Phillip and stop him from going through with his planned robbery. He tips the police of Panino/Phillip's plans and a trap is laid to catch the felon, but he escapes and decides to take revenge on the detective in charge of hunting him down. He ends up killing the detective, but is in turn killed by Dr. Clarke.

Cast 
Edward Norris as Philip Bennett
Marlo Dwyer as Helen Lengel
Eleanor Lawson as Louise Hammond
Frederick Burton as Hobart Bennett
Addison Richards as Lt. Detective George Bradley
Edward Keane as Dr. Richard Clark
Hugh Sothern as Prof. Toller
Tom Seidel as Reginald "Reg" Bennett
Elliott Sullivan as Eric
Anthony Warde as Hugo
Ernie Adams as Gimpy
Kenne Duncan as Jess Fowler
George Dobbs as Tim Martin
Lois Landon as Aunt Margaret
Frances Richards as Nurse
Jack Buckley as Mitch Larsen
Jack Ingram as Ed. Sporady
George Kirby as The Bennett Butler

References

External links 

1942 films
American science fiction horror films
1942 crime films
1940s science fiction horror films
American black-and-white films
Monogram Pictures films
Resurrection in film
American crime films
Films directed by Phil Rosen
1940s English-language films
1940s American films